The 2010 Little Caesars Pizza Bowl was an NCAA bowl game (previously the Motor City Bowl game) played at 8:30 p.m. EST on December 26, 2010 at Ford Field in Detroit, Michigan and aired on ESPN. The bowl game matched up the Florida International Panthers of the Sun Belt Conference against the Toledo Rockets of the Mid-American Conference.

The game was the 14th installment of the bowl game played in Detroit.

Teams

Florida International

Florida International played in its first bowl game in school history. The Panthers were the 2010 Sun Belt Conference Champions. They came into the game with a 6-6 overall record. They were led by an outstanding defense that had helped them almost pull off upsets against Rutgers and Texas A&M. FIU was invited to play in the bowl as the Big Ten Conference was unable to fill its slot in the contest.

Toledo

Toledo entered the bowl with an 8-4 overall record. The Rockets were making their first bowl appearance since 2005 when they defeated UTEP in the GMAC Bowl. Three of its four losses this season were to bowl-bound teams: Boise State, Northern Illinois and Arizona. This was the fourth time in school history that the Rockets played in the Little Caesars Pizza Bowl. They played in the game when it was known as the Motor City Bowl in 2001, 2002, and 2004. They were 1-2 in previous matchups with their only win coming in 2001 against Cincinnati.

Game summary

Scoring

Statistics

Game notes
The Little Caesars Pizza Bowl marked the first ever bowl meeting between the two schools. However, these two schools have met twice before in 2008 and 2009 with each University splitting the results. FIU leads the series 3-1.

References

Little Caesars Pizza Bowl
Little Caesars Pizza Bowl
FIU Panthers football bowl games
Toledo Rockets football bowl games
December 2010 sports events in the United States
2010 in sports in Michigan
2010 in Detroit